Woodville Park railway station is located on the Grange and Outer Harbor lines. Situated in the western Adelaide suburb of Woodville Park, it is 6.8 kilometres from Adelaide station.

History

This station was built in 1936.

Although the surrounding suburb was built in the 1870s, a station was not provided until December 1936. It was the first station on the line to have an island platform. The station has been unattended since 1980.

Services by platform

References

Railway stations in Adelaide
Railway stations in Australia opened in 1936